Ole Højlund Pedersen (born 17 February 1943) is a former Danish cyclist. He competed at the 1964 Summer Olympics and the 1968 Summer Olympics.

References

External links
 

1943 births
Living people
Danish male cyclists
Olympic cyclists of Denmark
Cyclists at the 1964 Summer Olympics
Cyclists at the 1968 Summer Olympics
Sportspeople from Aarhus